Alfred Higgins Burne DSO (1886–1959) was a soldier and military historian. He invented the concept of Inherent Military Probability; in battles and campaigns where there is some doubt over what action was taken, Burne believed that the action taken would be one which a trained staff officer of the twentieth century would take.

Career 
Alfred Burne was educated at Winchester School and RMA Woolwich, before being  commissioned into the Royal Artillery in 1906. He was awarded the DSO during the First World War and, during World War II, was Commandant of the 121st Officer Cadet Training Unit. He retired as a Lieutenant-Colonel.

He was Military Editor of Chambers Encyclopedia from 1938 to 1957 and  became an authority on the history of land warfare. He was a contributor to the Oxford Dictionary of National Biography.

Burne lived in Kensington and his funeral was held at St Mary Abbots there.

Inherent Military Probability 
Burne introduced the concept of Inherent Military Probability (IMP) to the study of military history.  He himself defined it thus :

My method here is to start with what appear to be undisputed facts, then to place myself in the shoes of each commander in turn, and to ask myself in each case what I would have done.  This I call working on Inherent Military Probability. I then compare the resulting action with the existing record in order to see whether it discloses any incompatibility with the existing facts.  If not, I then go on to the next debatable or obscure point in the battle and repeat the operation  

More succinctly, John Keegan defined IMP as 
The solution of an obscurity by an estimate of what a trained soldier would have done in the circumstances

Burne's approach has been criticised on the grounds that his concept of Inherent Military Probability puts modern military thinking and doctrine into the minds of mediaeval monarchs. However, it does treat war leaders as intelligent, thinking creatures, and veteran mediaeval leaders were often likely to come to the same conclusion as British staff officers, albeit by different thought processes.

Bibliography
Mesopotamia, The Last Phase (1936),
Lee, Grant and Sherman (1938),
The Art of War on Land (1944),
The Noble Duke of York (1949),
The Battlefields of England (1949),
More Battlefields of England (1953),
The Crecy War (1954) and
The Agincourt War (1956).
A military history of the First Civil War (1642-1646) (with Peter Young, 1959)

References

1886 births
1959 deaths
People educated at Winchester College
Graduates of the Royal Military Academy, Woolwich
Royal Artillery officers
Companions of the Distinguished Service Order
British military historians